Eocystites was a genus of Cambrian stem-group echinoderm of Australia and Vermont.

References

Prehistoric echinoderm genera
Cambrian echinoderms
Prehistoric invertebrates of Oceania